The Soestdijk class was a class of 8 gunvessels of the Royal Netherlands Navy. The class was built to the same design as the preceding Haarlemmermeer class, but proved far more durable.

Context 
In the late 1850s the Dutch navy seemed to have a found a suitable model for gunvessels that could be used in the Netherlands as well as in the Dutch East Indies and West Indies. This was the Haarlemmermeer class, which seemed very promising while it was still on the slipway. Without waiting for proof of the abilities of the Haarlemmermeer the Dutch navy ordered a second batch of these vessels, the Soestdijk class.

The Haarlemmermeer class had been ordered from commercial shipyards. Construction by state shipyards or commercial shipyards was a point of political controversy fueled by ideology. Indeed Johannes Servaas Lotsy was minister of the navy when all these ships were ordered. The difference was that Jan Jacob Rochussen was prime minister from 18 March 1858 to 23 February 1860. From 23 February 1860 to 14 March 1861 it was Floris Adriaan van Hall.

Anyway, a second series of ships according to the Haarlemmermeer design was started. In 1860 the navy decided to build 5 more ships to the same design on state owned shipyards. Three at the Rijskwerf Amsterdam, and two on the Rijskwerf Vlissingen. The reasons given for this apparent change of policy was that the government saw an advantage in lengthening the construction time of ships on the slipway, and that this way the national shipyards could use their supply of wood only suitable for small ships. Even before the lead ship of the Haarlemmermeer class had been commissioned, the Soestdijk and Coehoorn were laid down at the (state owned) Rijkswerf Amsterdam.

Characteristics

General  
The ships of the Soestdijk were built according to the same design as the Haarlemmermeer class. Tideman gives the length of 38 m in his overview of active ships. That is for the Kijkduin, Aart van Nes, Schouwen and Bommelerwaard. On the other hand the already decommissioned Brielle and Maas en Waal were in the overview of already decommissioned ships, and got a length of 40.7 m. The beam and draught are equal in both overviews. 

The explanation for the difference is that in the overview of active ships Tideman gave the length between perpendiculars. In the overview of retired ships the length was measured including the rudderpost.

Propulsion 
Propulsion of the class was the same as that of the Haarlemmermeer class.

Armament 
Armament of the class was the same as that of the Haarlemmermeer class.

Criticism 
The class was built to the same design as the Haarlemmermeer class, which got much criticism in the 1862 investigation of the navy by the Dutch House of Representatives. By the time that the first ships of the Soestdijk class were commissioned, this inquiry had long been finished. 

Contrary to the short-lived Haarlemmermeer class, the ships of the Soestdijk class had a lifespan comparable to other screw steamship classes.

Ships in the class

Notes on individual ships 

The Aart van Nes was decommissioned in 1879 in Surabaya and converted to a ship for pilots on the eastern approaches of the city. While there she was sunk in early 1881 when S.S. Drenthe hit her.

Construction

Notes

References
 
 
 
 

Ships of the Royal Netherlands Navy
19th-century naval ships of the Netherlands